Major General Stanley Eric Reinhart (September 15, 1893 – June 4, 1975) was a senior United States Army officer of the United States Army. He figured prominently in World War II as commander of the 65th Infantry Division.

Early life and military career

Reinhart was born on September 15, 1893 in Polk, Ohio (pop. 250). He worked briefly as a rural school teacher, in North Red Haw, Ohio, until 1911. He entered the United States Military Academy (USMA) at West Point, New York in 1912, graduating from there in 1916, and was commissioned as a second lieutenant into the Field Artillery Branch of the United States Army at Fort Bliss, Texas. Fay B. Prickett, Horace L. McBride, William R. Woodward, Thomas Lyle Martin, Roland P. Shugg, Otto F. Lange, Louis E. Hibbs, Joseph M. Tully, Thomas D. Finley, William M. Hoge, Ludson D. Worsham, Dwight Johns, Calvin DeWitt Jr., Robert Neyland, Wilhelm D. Styer and James Joseph O'Hare, all of them destined to attain general officer rank, were among Reinhart's fellow graduates.

As aide-de-camp to Brigadier General Peyton C. March (who became Army Chief of Staff in 1918) Reinhart sailed for France on June 30, 1917, almost three months after the American entry into World War I. After arriving on the Western Front, the main theater of war, in late 1917, he assumed command of Battery 'A' of the 17th Field Artillery Regiment, part of the 2nd Division of the American Expeditionary Forces (AEF), from February 12, 1918 to July 10, 1918 (in action during the defense of sector from March 21 to May 12, Battle of Bois de Belleau). Next, Reinhart commanded the 1st Battalion, 17th Field Artillery Regiment (Battle of Soissons, Ypres-Lys, and Meuse-Argonne). He commanded the battalion until the war ended on November 11, 1918 with the signing of the armistice with Germany. Reinhart was awarded the Army Distinguished Service Medal for his actions in combat during World War I. The citation for his Army DSM reads:

Between the wars
On August 4, 1919, almost nine months after the war ended, Reinhart returned to the United States, where he married Jeannette Crane of Toledo, Ohio, on May 5, 1920, at West Point, New York. They had a son and daughter.

Between the wars he served three years as an instructor of field artillery tactics at the USMA; four years in the U.S. Army Command and General Staff School and the U.S. Army War College; two years as instructor at the U.S. Army Field Artillery School; three years General Staff with troops in Hawaii; and four years as Treasurer at West Point, New York. On July 1, 1937 he was promoted to lieutenant colonel, and again, almost four years later, to the temporary rank of full colonel on June 26, 1941. By this time he was serving in Hawaii as executive officer (XO) of the 8th Field Artillery Regiment, having been in this post since September 1940. Soon afterwards, however, Reinhart was made commanding officer (CO) of the 13th Field Artillery Regiment, then also serving in Hawaii.

World War II
As a temporary brigadier general from March 11, 1942, three months after the American entry into World War II, he commanded the artillery of the 25th Infantry Division, defending the shores of Oahu in the Pacific War. On December 6, 1942, Reinhart sailed for Guadalcanal to participate in operations that would ultimately help terminate hostilities there. Ordered home to the United States by the War Department on April 22, 1943, he landed at San Francisco, California on April 26.

From July 1, 1943 until December 18, 1944, Reinhart, who received a temporary promotion to the rank of major general on September 17, 1943 (and promoted to the permanent rank of colonel on August 1, 1944), organized and trained the 65th Infantry Division at Camp Shelby, Mississippi. He was aided by his Assistant Division Commander (ADC), Brigadier General Henry A. Barber until November when Brigadier John E. Copeland replaced him.

On January 10, 1945, as the Commanding General (CG) of the 65th, he, with his division, sailed to the European Theater of Operations (ETO). He joined Lieutenant General George Patton's U.S. Third Army at the Sarre River, and fought with it on the Western Front across Germany and Austria.

Under his leadership, the 65th Division managed forced crossings of the Fulda, Werra, Danube, Inn, Traun, and Enns Rivers. His soldiers took the German cities of Saarlautern, Neunkirchen, Oberursel, Friedberg, Hattenback, Bebra, Rottenburg (Bavaria), Treffurt, Langensalza, Neumarkt, Regensburg, and Passau—as well as Schärding, Eferding, Linz, and Enns in Austria. His men captured the German Danube Flotilla and the Hungarian Navy, consisting of 25 armed ships and over 400 other craft.

At the end of combat, Reinhart and the 65th Infantry Division were over 100 miles (160 kilometers) east of a north and south line through Berlin, Germany. Fighting in Europe was to end at midnight on May 8, 1945. By now a major general, Reinhart arrived in Erlauf, a hamlet in Austria, where he met the Soviets and shook hands with his counterpart. In addition to commanding his own troops, Reinhart was soon appointed as military governor of Upper Austria.

Reinhart continued to reside in Linz, where the 65th Infantry Division, and subsequently the 26th Infantry Division, had its headquarters.

Later years
Hospitalized on October 15, 1945, Reinhart returned to the United States as a patient on November 15, 1945. On September 30, 1946, he retired from the army after 30 years due to physical disability, with the rank of major general. He died in Hendersonville, North Carolina on June 4, 1975, at the age of 81, and was buried at West Point Cemetery.

Awards and honors
Stanley Reinhart received many military decorations during his career. He also became an honorary member of the Russian Guards.

Major General Reinhart's ribbon bar:

References

External links

65th Infantry Division Association
"Right to be Proud: History of the 65th Infantry Division's March Across Germany" (World War II unit history booklet published in 1945)
Generals of World War II

|-

1893 births
1975 deaths
United States Army Field Artillery Branch personnel
United States Military Academy faculty
People from Ashland County, Ohio
United States Army generals
United States Military Academy alumni
United States Army Command and General Staff College alumni
United States Army War College alumni
United States Army personnel of World War I
Military personnel from Ohio
Recipients of the Distinguished Service Medal (US Army)
Recipients of the Silver Star
Recipients of the Legion of Merit
Officiers of the Légion d'honneur
Recipients of the Croix de Guerre 1939–1945 (France)
United States Army generals of World War II
Burials at West Point Cemetery